Deesa is a city and a municipality in the Banaskantha district in the state of Gujarat, India.

History

Deesa is situated on the east banks of the river Banas. Deesa was an estate and thana ( faujdari/thanedari ) ruled by the Mandori (Jhalori) dynasty. Today original Deesa is known as Juna Deesa.

New Deesa was also recognized as Camp Deesa. In 1820, the British military cantonment named Deesa Field Brigade  was built in the middle of Rajasthan and Palanpur to maintain and protect the regions between Abu and Kutch from dacoits and the incursions of the desert and Parkar Khosas into Vagad and north-west Gujarat. The cantonment had a resident Catholic chaplain and a chapel.

Deesa, as an estate of Palanpur, was under Palanpur Agency of Bombay Presidency, which in 1925 became the Banas Kantha Agency. After Independence of India in 1947, Bombay Presidency was reorganized in Bombay State. When Gujarat state was formed in 1960 from Bombay State, it fell under Banaskantha district of Gujarat. Deesa expanded significantly in recent times due to growth in agricultural produce business of potatoes and other commodities. Many Rajput clans like Gohil, Rathod, Raja, Galsar etc. reside here after migration from Rajasthan.

Deesa has a non-functioning airport.

Climate

Demographics
As per provisional reports of Census of India, population of Deesa in 2011  is 111,149; of which male and female are 58,724 and 52,425 respectively. The sex ratio of Deesa city is 895 per 1000 males.

Places
There are swaminarayan temple,Jalaram Temple,Vishveshvar Mahadev Temple and Also two Jain temples and a mosque.

A tower known as Hawai Pillar was constructed by the British in 1824 to measure air pressure. It is renovated in 2013 as a heritage monument.

Education

Computer Class & Accounting Classes 
 Bhavani Computer Education Center 
 Bhavani Account Classes

Schools 
 Sir Charles Watson High School, established in 1853, is one of the oldest schools in Deesa and also State of Gujarat. It is run by Deesa Nagar Palika. It has twenty-one classrooms and an enrolment capacity of 1500 students.
 St. Xavier's School 
 DNJ Adarsh School 
 St. Anne's School (Only KG and 1 to 10 standard)
 Sardar Patel School
 Angels English School (KG and 1 to 12 standard Science, Commerce,Arts)
 Vibrant School Of Science
 model school deesa

colleges 
 DNP Arts and Commerce College
 Smt. Chandanben S.S. Shah BCA College
 Bets B.Sc., BCA, BBA, PGDCA, Rasana Mota College

Economy

Agriculture
Deesa is known for its potato plantations. Considering the area under cultivation and agro-climatic conditions for potato research, a centre of All India Co-ordinated Potato Improvement Project was initiated in 1971–72, with the financial help of Indian Council of Agricultural Research (ICAR), New Delhi. Thereafter ICAR realized the need for multidisciplinary long-range research for increasing the production of this valuable crop and strengthened the project during Fifth Five Year Plan (1975–80) to have systematic research work on potato started to overcome the farmers problems of the state. Sardarkrushinagar Dantiwada Agricultural University runs a potato research station in Deesa. It falls under the North Gujarat Agroclimatic Zone-IV of the State.

The town is also major medical hub in the region.

Doctors
Dr. Deepak Modi (B.A.M.S)

Dr. Prakash B. Sundesha (M.B.D.C.H)

Cities and towns in Banaskantha district